Anti-national is a pejorative label and political catchphrase that has been widely used during the premiership of Narendra Modi, especially in media discourse. It is a connotation for anti-Indian sentiment in an Indian citizen, suggesting anti-government or seditious behavior (however outside of the sedition law Section 124A of the Indian Penal Code). In November 2021, a parliamentary panel sought a definition for "anti-national" from the union Ministry of Information and Broadcasting.

See also 

 Godi media
 Tukde Tukde Gang

References

Further reading 

 Books

 </ref>

 Articles

 
 
 
 
 
 
 
 
 
 
Political neologisms
Propaganda in India